Lat or LAT may refer to:

Places 

 Lat, Fuman, village in Gilan Province, Iran
 Lat, Rasht, village in Gilan Province, Iran
 Lat, Mazandaran, village in Iran
 Lat-e Disar, village in Mazandaran Province, Iran
 Lat, Qazvin, village in Iran

Media 

Los Angeles Times, American newspaper
LAT TV, American Spanish-language TV network

Science 

Latissimus dorsi muscle, a muscle on the back trunk of the upper body
LAT (gene), which encodes Linker of Activated T cells 
Latitude
LAT1 large neutral amino acid transporter
Blatta lateralis, a species of cockroach

Technology 

Local Area Transport, a non-routable networking technology
Lam Tin station's MTR station code
Large Area Telescope, an instrument aboard Fermi Gamma-ray Space Telescope

People 
Lat (cartoonist) (born 1951), Malaysian cartoonist
David Lat (born 1975), American lawyer and blogger

Other 

Al-Lat, a pre-Islamic Arabian goddess
Latvia's IOC country code
Latvian lats, the former currency of Latvia (lats is the singular form)
Living apart together, a term for couples who reside separately
Lowest astronomical tide, a common chart datum

See also
Lath (disambiguation)
HHV Latency Associated Transcript (HHV LAT), a herpes simplex virus gene